The 2011 Women's World Open Squash Championship is the women's edition of the 2011 World Open, which serves as the individual world championship for squash players. The event took place at the New Luxor Theatre in Rotterdam in the Netherlands from 1 to 6 November. Nicol David won her sixth World Open trophy, beating Jenny Duncalf in the final.

Prize money and ranking points
For 2011, the prize purse was $143,000. The prize money and points breakdown is as follows:

Seeds

Draw and results

See also
2011 Men's World Open Squash Championship
World Open
WSA World Series 2011

References

External links
World Open 2011 official website
Worldopensquash.com

World Squash Championships
W
2011 in Dutch sport
Sports competitions in Rotterdam
Squash tournaments in the Netherlands
Squash in Europe
2011 in women's squash
International sports competitions hosted by the Netherlands